Abyss was a gaming magazine first published in 1979, edited by Dave Nalle and published by Ragnarok Games. It was headquartered in Washington, D.C.

Contents
Abyss was a bimonthly zine-type magazine focusing on fantasy role-playing games including New Ysgarth Rules (also published by Ragnarok Games) and Dungeons & Dragons. Each issue was twenty offset pages in length, with a reported circulation of about 175. Regular content included new fantasy monsters, character classes, magic items and spells; opinion pieces; and in every other issue, a mini-adventure. Later, the frequency of Abyss was switched to quarterly.

Reception
In the June 1981 edition of Dragon, Dave Nalle reviewed his own magazine, saying, "The main weakness of Abyss is a tendency in some articles to deal with subjects which are too complex or too specific to be fitted well into any campaign. It also deals with some material which might not interest every reader."

In the July 1981 edition of The Space Gamer (Issue No. 41), Ronald Pehr commented on the difference between the magazine's stated desire to expand to new roleplaying games, and its actual content. "The publishers are creative, doing their best on an obviously minuscule budget, but it is difficult to recommend a magazine which won't please the majority of gamers. Abyss is trying to expand coverage of the gaming field, but to date most of the writers have limited themselves to D&D or New Ysgarth Rules."

Reviews
Pegasus #8 (July/Aug., 1982)

References

Bimonthly magazines published in the United States
Defunct magazines published in the United States
Hobby magazines published in the United States
Magazines established in 1979
Magazines published in Washington, D.C.
Magazines with year of disestablishment missing
Quarterly magazines published in the United States
Role-playing game magazines